Gonohotta 1971 (Bengali: গণহত্যা ১৯৭১) is a sculpture by Hashem Khan collaborating with Mahmudul Hasan Shohag in Bharat-Bangladesh Maitri Udyan on 2017.

References

Asian sculpture
 
 
South Asia
Sculpture
Sculptures by Mahmudul Hasan Shohag
2017 sculptures